Ulrich Höfer (born 7 July 1957, in Zusmarshausen) is a German professor of physics at the University of Marburg. He received his Ph.D. in 1989. According to Google Scholar, Höfer has an h-index of 44/50 (Scopus/Goggle Scholar). His main research area is Surface Dynamics.

Research areas 
 Ultrafast dynamics of electronic excitations
 Adsorption on semiconductor surfaces
 Time-resolved two-photon photoemission
 Laser spectroscopy of surfaces and interfaces

Awards and recognition 
 Arnold Sommerfeld Prize of the Bavarian Academy of Sciences and Humanities (1995)
 Fellow der American Physical Society (2006)
 Fellow der Japan Society for the Promotion of Science (2015)

Publications 
 
 Nichtlineare optische Spektroskopie an Siliziumoberflächen, Habilitationsschrift, Physics Department, Technische Universität München (1996).

References

External links 
 Philipps-University Marburg Physics Faculty Page
 CV Höfer

1957 births
Academic staff of the University of Marburg
20th-century German physicists
Living people
21st-century German physicists
People from Augsburg (district)
Fellows of the American Physical Society